Annawan Community Unit School District 226 is a public school district in Annawan, Illinois. The Annawan Grade School was built in 1974 west of the Annawan High School (1959). It serves over 230 students from Annawan, Hooppole, and Mineral.

References

External links
 Annawan Public Schools — official site

Education in Bureau County, Illinois
Education in Henry County, Illinois
School districts in Illinois